Chan Kwok-Hung (陳國雄, c. 1963 – 17 December 2014) was a Hong Kong cinematographer. His credits, as director of photography or camera operator, included the 2000 action comedy Tokyo Raiders and the 2007 action drama Invisible Target. He also received best cinematography nominations at the Hong Kong Film Awards  for Fly Me to Polaris in 2000 and Summer Holiday in 2001.

Chan drowned when a motorised sampan he was in capsized in Sunny Bay off Lantau Island in Hong Kong. He and seven others (who all survived) were on a shoot for the Jackie Chan film Skiptrace.

References

External links

1960s births
2014 deaths
Hong Kong cinematographers
Deaths by drowning
Deaths due to shipwreck
Accidental deaths in Hong Kong